Aaskouandy is a gnostic symbol taken from Native American beliefs, especially Iroquois folklore.

In folklore traditions the symbol functions as a magical charm which both protects and can potentially harm the wearer. Because of the dangers associated with the charm, its owner is required to maintain a good relationship with the object by providing offerings and care.

It is described as an object which appears unexpected (location and/or shape) and which is inscribed with powers usually connected to its unexpected nature. Commonly, aaskouandy charms are found from gizzard stones. If the aaskouandy found is in the shape of a fish or a serpent it is seen as extra potent and becomes an Onniont.

References

Gnosticism
Iroquois mythology